Khanpasha Nuradilovich Nuradilov (6 July 1924 – 12 September 1942) was a Soviet machine gunner in the Red Army between 1940-1942. He is credited with killing an estimated 920 enemy soldiers with his PM M1910 machine gun, making him the highest-scoring machine gunner of all time. He also captured 18 Nazi German soldiers alive and 7 German machine guns. He was posthumously awarded the title Hero of the Soviet Union for his valiant last stand in the Battle of Stalingrad. As his body was never found it is suspected that he was killed by ordnance dropped by German bombers.

Awards
 Hero of the Soviet Union
 Order of Lenin
 Order of the Red Banner
 Order of the Red Star

Footnotes

References

Chechen military personnel of World War II
1924 births
1942 deaths
Chechen people
Heroes of the Soviet Union
Soviet military personnel killed in World War II
Recipients of the Order of the Red Banner
Recipients of the Order of Lenin
Deaths by airstrike during World War II